Doume is a small town in central Gabon.

Transport 
It has a small station on the Trans-Gabon Railway.

See also 
 Transport in Gabon

References 

Populated places in Ogooué-Lolo Province